() is the rank usually held by enlisted personnel in some East Asian militaries. The ranks are used in both the People's Republic of China and the Republic of China on Taiwan, and both North and South Korea. The rank name is based on the on one of the four ancient occupations.

Etymology

s, who work closely with their US military counterparts, are frequently addressed as "sergeant" or the equivalent E-5 term in English by the U.S. military. This varies however by unit. In a similar vein, some US E-5s are called hasa by the ROKA members, as their status is one of an NCO.

History
An even lower rank, that of mudeungbyeong (Hanja:), also known as hullyeonbyeong (Hanja:), is usually believed to be held by enlisted recruits in basic training, and those recruits are not allowed to have any insignia on their uniform until they finish the training course, but they are actually regarded to be ideungbyeong (the lowest byeong rank) officially.

The South Korean military, however, does not generally grant NCO powers to a service member until obtaining the rank of hasa. Still,  in South Korea is exceptionally considered as an NCO when holding the squad leader position.

The word byeong (soldier) has a natural context that personnel in those ranks are not in commanding responsibilities, thus not NCOs at all. They are strictly distinguished from the ranks above in many respects. Personnel with ranks of hasa or above are called ganbu (Hanja:), as an antonym of byeong. South Korea's South Korean military are retained by the conscription system. If a person is enlisted to an armed force and has not applied for NCO or officer, then his highest rank until he finishes the mandatory service term (21 months in case of the ROK Army, as of 2012) is to be the highest rank of byeong (i.e. ).

Chinese variant

People's Liberation Army 

Republic of China Armed Forces

Korean variant

See also
 Shi (rank)
Comparative military ranks of Korea

References

Military ranks of South Korea